The Carrizozo Commercial Historic District, in Carrizozo, New Mexico, is an  historic district which was listed on the National Register of Historic Places in 2016.

The listing included 30 contributing buildings, two contributing structures, and a contributing site.

It includes the Carrizozo Woman's Club, a Masonic Temple, and more.

References

Historic districts on the National Register of Historic Places in New Mexico
National Register of Historic Places in Lincoln County, New Mexico